Halloween Baking Championship is an American cooking competition show that premiered on Food Network on October 5, 2015. Like its sister show, Holiday Baking Championship, it's a seasonal program that runs for a few weeks (in this case, the month of October) and aims to crown the best baker of spooky, creepy desserts.

Rounds
Each episode has two rounds. The first round is the "Preliminary Heat" where the bakers are first told of their themes and get varying cook times (anywhere from 30 minutes up to 2 hours) to create a small pastry (usual cookies or small cakes). The person who wins the first round gets an advantage going into the next round, and aren't told until after the second round is announced (and sometimes they're not told until the middle of cooking in the second round). The advantage varies by episode (Ex: exclusive use of a certain baking mold/ingredient or first choice of a specific theme).

The second round is called the "Main Heat" and the contestants get a considerably longer time to bake than the "pre-heat" (in the final round of the final episode they're given several hours to make a large confection). This larger dessert must fit a new theme presented (usually in the same vein as the pre-heat theme). The winner of the "Main Heat" advances to the next episode. One baker is eliminated every episode except for the last one. In the finale it's down to the final three or four contestants competing in a winner-take-all final round. The winner gets $25,000 and a spot In Food Network Magazine in season 4–5.

Host & Judges
Unlike its sister show, Holiday Baking Championship, the panel of judges has changed consistently throughout the series (with the exception of Carla Hall).

The first season was hosted by Richard Blais with chefs Carla Hall, Ron Ben-Israel and Sherry Yard serving as judges. The second season saw Carla Hall as the only returning chef/judge. She was joined by Food Network personality Sandra Lee and Damiano Carrara to help judge, and comedian Jeff Dunham as the host. For seasons three through five, the show was hosted by John Henson. Lorraine Pascale and Zac Young joined Carla Hall as judges for the third and fourth seasons, while Katie Lee replaced Pascale for season five. For the sixth season Carla Hall returned not only as a judge but as the show's host, accompanied by Zac Young and Stephanie Boswell as judges. John Henson later returned to serve as host in 2021 for seasons seven and eight.

Series overview

References

External links
 
 
 LEG

 
2010s American cooking television series
2020s American cooking television series
2015 American television series debuts
American television spin-offs
English-language television shows
Food Network original programming
Reality television spin-offs
Television series by Levity Live